Alice Bradley Neal (September 13, 1828 – August 23, 1863) was a 19th-century American writer. She wrote under many names and aliases, including Alice G. Lee, Alice B. Neal, Clara Cushman, Mrs. Joseph C. Neal and Alice B. Haven.

Life
She was born with the given name Emily in Hudson, New York, and was a widow by age 19. Her first husband was author and editor Joseph C. Neal. She adopted the name Alice in 1846. In 1853, she married again, to broker Samuel Neal, and moved with him to rural New York. Beset by illness, she bore him five children, dying shortly after the birth of the last.

Career

For the Godey's Lady's Book and the Graham's American Monthly Magazine of Literature and Art, both publications out of Philadelphia between the years 1846 and 1864, Alice had over 30 poems and short stories published.  She also wrote for The American Female Poets and The Gem of The Western World and did the written accompaniment for her husband's book Neal, Joseph C. Charcoal Sketches. Second Series, published in 1848.

Selected works
1847
 January; "Asking Forgiveness" (poem) (as Alice G. Lee) 
 March; "The Blind Wife" (poem) (as Alice G. Lee) 
 July; "Love and Glory" (poem) (as Alice Gordon Lee)

1848
 February; "Mistaking the Person" (short) (as Mrs. Joseph C. Neal) 
 July; "The Gossips of Rivertown" a.k.a. "Lessons of Charity" (short) (as Mrs. Joseph C. Neal)

1849
 December; "Gossips and Tokens" (short)

1850
 January; "Ideal Husbands" a.k.a. "School-Girl Fancies" (short) (as Mrs. Joseph C. Neal) 
 February; "The Nest at Home" (short) (as Mrs. Joseph C. Neal)
 March; "The Young Bride's Trials" (short) (as Mrs. Joseph C. Neal) 
 May; "A Gift from Heaven" (short) (as Mrs. Joseph C. Neal) 
 July; "Bishop White Administering the Sacrament" (poem and essay) (as Mrs. Alice B. Neal) 
 August; "The Christian Mother" (poem) (as Alice B. Neal)
 October; "Which is the Mother?" (short) (as Alice B. Neal) 
 November; "Furnishing" a.k.a. "Two Ways of Commencing Life" (short) (as Alice B. Neal) 
 December; "A Reminiscence of Jenny Lind" (quotes poem from Wm. C. Richards) (as Alice B. Neal)

1858
"Personal Reminiscences of Miss Eliza Leslie," Godey's Lady's Book 56. 1858. Page 344. (As Alice B. Haven)

References

External links
 

1828 births
1863 deaths
19th-century American writers
19th-century American women writers
People from Hudson, New York
Writers from New York (state)
Pseudonymous women writers
19th-century pseudonymous writers